Churdhar Sanctuary is located in Sirmaur district of the Indian state of Himachal Pradesh. The total covered area of this sanctuary is 56.16 square kilometres as notified on 15 November 1985. Fauna includes Himalayan black bear, Barking deer, Musk deer, Langur and Leopards. The work of administration at Churdhar is taken care by Chureshwar Sewa Samiti.

The sanctuary is named after Churdhar Peak. Churdhar (elevation of 3,647 metres; 11,965 feet) is the highest peak in Sirmour district and is also the highest peak in the outer Himalayas. The peak has a great religious significance for the people of Sirmour, Shimla, Chaupal and Solan of Himachal Pradesh and Dehradun of Uttarakhand. Churdhar is a holy place related with Shri Shirgul Maharaj (Chureshwar Maharaj), a deity widely worshipped in Sirmour and Chaupal. The main routes for arrival are from Nohradhar to 18 Km, (Sirmour)and Sarain, Chaupal of 8 km.

The Churdhar Peak is mentioned in the book, The Great Arc, by John Keay but is referred to as The Chur. It is from this peak that George Everest made many astronomical readings and sightings of the Himalaya mountains around 1834. He was the Surveyor General of India and did the initial survey of the full length of India as well as some very accurate measurements of the earth's curvature.

Access

Airways: Jubbarhatti airport (23 km from Shimla)
Nearest railhead: Shimla to Kalka narrow-gauge railway line 
Nearest city: Chaupal, Himachal Pradesh 
The sanctuary has a well connected road network.

References

External links
himachaltourism.nic.in
hptdc.gov.in
Maa Bhangayani Temple, Haripurdhar
sirmour.co.in

Instagram.Com/Churdhar_
 https://hpsirmaur.nic.in/tourist-place/churdhar/

Wildlife sanctuaries in Himachal Pradesh
Geography of Sirmaur district
Protected areas with year of establishment missing